Cristo Rey Jesuit High School Milwaukee is a coeducational, Catholic, college preparatory school and a member of the Cristo Rey Network that follows the  work-study model of education.

History
The school is located at 45th and Scott Streets in West Milwaukee, in the former St. Florian Parish School building. It is under the direction of the Society of Jesus in the Catholic church and is open to students of all faiths. It serves students from families of limited means.

In November 2017 the school indicated it would be moving to a much larger and more conveniently located facility at 1818 W. National Ave.

References

Further reading
 Kearney, G. R. More Than a Dream: The Cristo Rey Story: How One School's Vision Is Changing the World. Chicago, Ill: Loyola Press, 2008.

External links
 Cristo Rey Network
 Bill & Melinda Gates Foundation - Success of Innovative Urban Catholic School Sparks Major Investment

Cristo Rey Network
Roman Catholic Archdiocese of Milwaukee
Jesuit high schools in the United States
Educational institutions established in 2015
Catholic secondary schools in Wisconsin
Poverty-related organizations
2015 establishments in Wisconsin